Sang Bon may refer to:
 Sang Bon, Alborz
 Sang Bon, Mazandaran